Surah may refer to:
Sura or Surah, a division of the Qur'an
Surah, an even-sided twill
Sura (city), a city in ancient Babylonia